Glyptophysa is a genus of medium-sized sinistral (left-handed) air-breathing freshwater snails, aquatic pulmonate gastropod mollusks in the family of Planorbidae.

Description 
Shells are medium-sized, smooth and globose to elongate. Shells of Glyptophysa are always sinistral. "Members of the genus possess a twist or fold on the columella, a feature lacking in Isidorella and Physella. Whorls round or carinate."

Distribution 
Australia, New Guinea, New Caledonia, New Zealand, Moluccas, Philippines, Sumatra, islands of South Pacific east to Tahiti, and Malaysia (introduced).

Habitat and ecology 
Often found on water weeds, submerged wood, rocks, gravel and sand in ponds, billabongs, swamps, and sluggish streams and rivers(both still and flowing). Occasionally on mud. "Feeds on algae and detritus." Glyptophysa snails are grazers-scrapers.

Species 
Species in this genus include:
 Glyptophysa (Glyptophysa) aliciae Reeve, 1862
 Glyptophysa (Glyptophysa) georgiana (Quoy & Gaimard, 1832) – King George's Freshwater Snail
 Glyptophysa (Oppletora) jukesii  (H.Adams, 1861)
 Glyptophysa multistrigata (Cooke, 1889) – tentatively placed here
 Glyptophysa (Glyptophysa) novaehollandica  (Bowdich, 1822)
 Glyptophysa gibbosa (Gould, 1846) (now treated as a synonym of G. novaehollandica)
 Glyptophysa badia (Adams and Angas, 1864) (now treated as a synonym of G. novaehollandica)
 Glyptophysa oconnori Cumber, 1941
 Glyptophysa petiti (Crosse 1872) – type species
 Glyptophysa proteus (Sowerby, 1873) – tentatively placed here
  Glyptophysa (Glyptophysa) vandiemenensis (Sowerby, 1873)
 Glyptophysa variabilis (Gray, 1843)

References

External links 
 http://keys.lucidcentral.org/keys/v3/freshwater_molluscs/Freshwater_Oct18/Media/Html/glyptophysa.htm
 Crosse H. (1872). Description d'un genre nouveau, et d'espèces inédites, provenant de la Nouvelle-Calédonie. Journal de Conchyliologie. 20: 148-154



Planorbidae
Taxonomy articles created by Polbot